Mauricio Nicasio Almada  (born 18 August 1976 in Lincoln, Buenos Aires) is an Argentine football left back currently playing for Almirante Brown.

Career 

Almada started his playing career in 1998 with Sarmiento and in 1999 he joined Gimnasia (CdU) where he played for three seasons in the Argentine 2nd division.

In 2002 Almada joined Arsenal de Sarandí of the Argentine Primera where he established himself as a regular starter. In 2006, he moved to Gimnasia y Esgrima de Jujuy.

References

External links
 
 
 

1976 births
Living people
People from Lincoln Partido
Argentine footballers
Association football defenders
Arsenal de Sarandí footballers
Gimnasia y Esgrima de Jujuy footballers
Quilmes Atlético Club footballers
Club Atlético Sarmiento footballers
Deportivo Merlo footballers
CSyD Tristán Suárez footballers
Club Almirante Brown footballers
Argentine Primera División players
Sportspeople from Buenos Aires Province